PalaLivorno (formerly known as PalaAlgida), from 2013 known as Modigliani Forum, is an indoor sporting arena located in Livorno, Italy. The capacity of the arena is 8033 people and was opened in 2004. It is currently home of the Basket Livorno basketball club team.

External links 
 PalaLivorno Official website

Indoor arenas in Italy
Basketball venues in Italy
Buildings and structures in Livorno
Sports venues in Tuscany
Sports venues completed in 2004
2004 establishments in Italy